The Type 04 automatic grenade launcher (military designation QLZ-04) is a Chinese 35x32SR mm belt-fed automatic grenade launcher, developed as an alternative to the older QLZ-87. It may be vehicle-mounted or crew-served.

See also
QLZ-87 grenade launcher
QTS-11
Norinco LG5 / QLU-11

International:
 Mk 19 grenade launcher
 Daewoo Precision Industries K4
 Howa Type 96
 Mk 47 Striker
 AGS-17
 AGS-30
 AGS-40
 Vektor Y3 AGL
 SB LAG 40
 HK GMG, similar weapon
 XM174 grenade launcher, similar weapon

References

Grenade launchers of the People's Republic of China
Automatic grenade launchers